The Palliser Formation is a stratigraphic unit of Late Devonian (Famennian) age in the Western Canada Sedimentary Basin. It is a thick sequence of limestone and dolomitic limestone that is present in the Canadian Rockies and foothills of western Alberta. Tall cliffs formed of the Palliser Formation can be seen throughout Banff and Jasper National Parks.

The formation was named for the Palliser Range in Banff National Park (which in turn took its name from John Palliser, the leader of the 1850s Palliser Expedition), by H.H. Beach in 1943. The type locality was defined in 1994 in the "Devil's Gap" section south of Mount Costigan of the Palliser Range, north of Lake Minnewanka.

Lithology and paleontology 
The Palliser Formation was deposited in a marine environment as an extensive carbonate shelf. It is subdivided into the Morro Member (the lower part) and the Costigan Member (the upper part). The Morro Member consists of massive, fine-grained limestone and dolomitic limestone. It contains remains of brachiopods, crinoids, gastropods,  ostracods and conodont elements. The Costigan Member is less dolomitic, more argillaceous, and more fossiliferous than the Morro. It contains remains of brachiopods, crinoids, conodont elements, nautiloids, bryozoans, stromatoporoids and stromatolites.
Anhydrite beds can be present in both members.

Distribution and thickness 

Relationship to other units 
The Palliser Formation is disconformably overlain by the Exshaw Formation and conformably underlain by the Alexo Formation. It is equivalent to the Wabamun Group in central Alberta, to the middle part of the Three Forks Formation in Saskatchewan and Montana and to the Tetcho Formation and Kotcho Formation in the Fort Nelson area of British Columbia.

Economic resources
Limestone quarried from the Palliser Formation is used to manufacture cement at Exshaw, Alberta.

References 

Geologic formations of Alberta
Devonian Alberta
Devonian southern paleotropical deposits
Famennian Stage
Dolomite formations
Limestone formations
Shallow marine deposits
Fossiliferous stratigraphic units of North America
Paleontology in Alberta